Gold Coast  is a compilation album by jazz musicians John Coltrane and Wilbur Harden, released in 1977 just after Dial Africa: The Savoy Sessions, featuring pieces recorded during the two 1958 sessions that produced Tanganyika Strut and Jazz Way Out.

Reception

In a review for AllMusic, Scott Yanow wrote: "John Coltrane's Savoy recordings with fluegelhornist Wilbur Harden are enjoyable but not particularly innovative... Despite all of the emphasis on Africa in the song titles, the music is essentially American bebop featuring Coltrane, Harden and trombonist Curtis Fuller; Harden and Fuller contributed two originals apiece. This album is a companion of Dial Africa."

Track listing
 "Tanganyika Strut" – 9:57
 "Dial Africa" – 8:42
 "Gold Coast" – 14:34
 "B.J." – 4:32

Personnel
 John Coltrane – tenor saxophone
 Wilbur Harden – trumpet, flugelhorn
 Curtis Fuller – trombone
 Tommy Flanagan – piano (tracks 1-3)
 Howard Williams – piano (track 4)
 Alvin Jackson – bass
 Art Taylor – drums

References

1977 compilation albums
John Coltrane compilation albums
Savoy Records compilation albums
Wilbur Harden albums
Albums recorded at Van Gelder Studio
Compilation albums published posthumously
Albums produced by Ozzie Cadena